The Universidad de Montevideo (in English: University of Montevideo) is a private (catholic, Opus Dei) university located in Montevideo, Uruguay. It opened in 1986, and obtained the right to be legally named a university in 1997. It has been ranked as the number one University in Uruguay by the QS World University Rankings four years in a row. As of 2019, the UM reached the TOP 500 in the general rankings according to the international organization.

Schools, Faculties & Centers
The UM has seven schools:
School of Management Science and Economics (Undergraduate and Graduate programs)
School of Law (Undergraduate and Graduate programs)
School of Communication (Undergraduate and Graduate programs)
School of Humanities (Undergraduate and Graduate programs)
School of Engineering (Undergraduate and Graduate programs)
IEEM (Business school - graduate programs only)
Center of Biomedical Sciences (Only Graduate programs)

Centers:

 CINOI: Innovation Center in Industrial Organization
 CEDEI: Center for Latin American Research & Documentation
 Initium: Center of Leadership, Entrepreneurship and Innovation
 Applied Economics Research Center 
 UM Library

International Office

The UM International Office is responsible for developing a coherent corporate strategy to promote Universidad de Montevideo's international relations, global profile, and international competitiveness. It complements the academic mission of the University by providing the services and programs necessary to facilitate international education. The UM holds academic agreements with more than 140 institutions worldwide that enable student mobility and research projects.

Academic programs

 B.A. in Accounting
 B.A. in Business Administration
 B.A. in Economics
 B.A. in International Business
 B.A. in Communications
 B.A. in Law
 B.A. in Humanities
 B.A. in History
 B.A. in Philosophy
 B.A. in Literature
 B.A. in Mathematics
 B.A. in English Language & Literature
 Degree in Civil Engineering
 Degree in Industrial Engineering
 Degree in Telematics Engineering
 Degree in Information Technology
 Public Notary Degree
 Teacher Education Programs

References

http://www.um.edu.uy/internacional/en/programs-by-school/

External links
Official Site
Exchange Student Blog and Information

 
Education in Montevideo
Universities in Uruguay
Educational institutions established in 1986
1986 establishments in Uruguay
Catholic universities and colleges in Uruguay
Opus Dei universities and colleges